Ana and the Others is a 2003 Argentine independent drama film directed and written by Celina Murga.

Plot
Twenty-something Ana, now living in Buenos Aires, returns to her native city of Paraná. She meets old school mates, old friends, makes new ones, and starts to rethink her life, and perhaps changes her future forever.

Cast
Juan Cruz Díaz la Barba as Matías
Natacha Massera as Natalia
Camila Toker as Ana
Ignacio Uslenghi as Diego

Release
The film premiered in Argentina on 21 April 2003 and premiered in over 10 major countries worldwide.

External links

2003 films
2000s Spanish-language films
2003 drama films
Argentine independent films
Argentine drama films
2003 independent films
2000s Argentine films